Joyce Joseph Malfil is a Nigerian taekwondo practitioner who competes in the women's senior category. She won a bronze medal at the 2011 All-African Games in the +73 kg category.

Sports career 
Joyce participated in the 2011 All-African Games held in Maputo, Mozambique in the 73 kg, she won a bronze medal.

References 

Living people
2000 births
Nigerian female taekwondo practitioners
Competitors at the 2011 All-Africa Games
Place of birth missing (living people)
African Games competitors for Nigeria
21st-century Nigerian women
African Games bronze medalists for Nigeria
African Games medalists in taekwondo